FLE may refer to:

 Family life education
 Federal law enforcement in the United States
 Field-level encryption in databases
 Flair Airlines (ICAO airline code FLE), Canadian ULCC discount airline
 Fleet railway station (station code FLE), Fleet, Hampshire, England, UK
 Football League of Europe
 Four Lane Ends Interchange, of the Tyne and Wear Metro
 Français langue étrangère (FLE, FLÉ), French as a foreign language
 Frontal lobe epilepsy
 FLE standard time (Finland, Lithuania/Latvia, Estonia time) - see Eastern European Time

See also

 
 
 
 Fles (disambiguation)
 F1E (disambiguation)
 FIE (disambiguation)